The Hopetoun Hotel, colloquially referred to as The Hoey, is a historic Sydney hotel and music venue in Surry Hills, New South Wales. It was built somewhere between 1836 and 1839, originally under the name of the Cookatoo Inn and then in 1901 revamped and named in honour of the first Governor General, Lord Hopetoun. In 1997 it was purchased by siblings Evangelos and Anastasia Patakas for $1.5 million and became a live music venue that saw performances by bands including the Hoodoo Gurus and Wolfmother. In 2009, it was closed due to accumulated fines and police citations for noise violations in a residential area. It has remained shut since, though it was used in 2012 as a set for The Wolverine (film).

It was a much loved venue by the community and Sarah Blasko spoke of its unique nature, "It's so intimate, you almost feel like you could order a drink from the stage".

History 
The hotel is a heritage listed building and has sat on the site for over 150 years forming a landmark feature in Surry Hills. It is an important architectural example of an early Federation warehouse style face brick building.

Renaming 

The hotel has been renamed many times:

 1839–1861: The Cockatoo Inn
 1861–1873: The Sportsman’s Arms
 1873–1885: Kilkenny Inn
 1885–1901: The Great Western Hotel
 1901–present: Hopetoun Hotel

Notable performances 
Acts who have played at the hotel include:

 Ed Kuepper
 Kim Salmon
 Died Pretty
 Hoodoo Gurus under the alias Dork Stick
 Wolfmother
 The Chemical Brothers
 Luke Vibert
 Jan Jelinek
 Sarah Blasko
 Paul Kelly
 You Am I as the Question Fruit
 Cockroaches
 The Coloured Girls
 Michael Hutchence (INXS)
 Angry Anderson
 Jenny Morris
 Tim Freedman (from the Whitlams)
 Mental as Anything
 Ratcat
 The Clouds
 The Grates
 The Jezabels
 Xiu Xiu
 Because of Ghosts
 Urthboy

References 

Pubs in Sydney
Surry Hills, New South Wales